The R316 is a regional route in the Western Cape province of South Africa that connects Caledon to the northwest with Arniston to the southeast via Bredasdorp and Napier.

The route begins at a junction with the N2 in Caledon. In Caledon, it gives off the R320 towards Hermanus. Leaving Caledon, its next major intersection is with the crossing R326. From there it continues onward to Napier and then Bredasdorp. Just outside Bredasdorp it receives R317, and in the town it overlaps with the R319. From Bredasdorp, the route reaches its coastal conclusion at Arniston.

References

External links
 
 Routes Travel Info

316